Gödel's ontological proof is a formal argument by the mathematician Kurt Gödel (1906–1978) for the existence of God. The argument is in a line of development that goes back to Anselm of Canterbury (1033–1109). St. Anselm's ontological argument, in its most succinct form, is as follows: "God, by definition, is that for which no greater can be conceived. God exists in the understanding. If God exists in the understanding, we could imagine Him to be greater by existing in reality. Therefore, God must exist." A more elaborate version was given by Gottfried Leibniz (1646–1716); this is the version that Gödel studied and attempted to clarify with his ontological argument.

Gödel left a fourteen-point outline of his philosophical beliefs in his papers. Points relevant to the ontological proof include:
4. There are other worlds and rational beings of a different and higher kind.
5. The world in which we live is not the only one in which we shall live or have lived.
13. There is a scientific (exact) philosophy and theology, which deals with concepts of the highest abstractness; and this is also most highly fruitful for science.
14. Religions are, for the most part, bad—but religion is not.

History 
The first version of the ontological proof in Gödel's papers is dated "around 1941". Gödel is not known to have told anyone about his work on the proof until 1970, when he thought he was dying. In February, he allowed Dana Scott to copy out a version of the proof, which circulated privately. In August 1970, Gödel told Oskar Morgenstern that he was "satisfied" with the proof, but Morgenstern recorded in his diary entry for 29 August 1970, that Gödel would not publish because he was afraid that others might think "that he actually believes in God, whereas he is only engaged in a logical investigation (that is, in showing that such a proof with classical assumptions (completeness, etc.) correspondingly axiomatized, is possible)." Gödel died January 14, 1978. Another version, slightly different from Scott's, was found in his papers. It was finally published, together with Scott's version, in 1987.

In letters to his mother, who was not a churchgoer and had raised Kurt and his brother as freethinkers, Gödel argued at length for a belief in an afterlife. He did the same in an interview with a skeptical Hao Wang, who said: "I expressed my doubts as G spoke [...] Gödel smiled as he replied to my questions, obviously aware that his answers were not convincing me." Wang reports that Gödel's wife, Adele, two days after Gödel's death, told Wang that "Gödel, although he did not go to church, was religious and read the Bible in bed every Sunday morning." In an unmailed answer to a questionnaire, Gödel described his religion as "baptized Lutheran (but not member of any religious congregation). My belief is theistic, not pantheistic, following Leibniz rather than Spinoza."

Outline

The proof uses modal logic, which distinguishes between necessary truths and contingent truths. In the most common semantics for modal logic, many "possible worlds" are considered. A truth is necessary if it is true in all possible worlds. By contrast, if a statement happens to be true in our world, but is false in another world, then it is a contingent truth. A statement that is true in some world (not necessarily our own) is called a possible truth.

Furthermore, the proof uses higher-order (modal) logic because the definition of God employs an explicit quantification over properties.

First, Gödel axiomatizes the notion of a "positive property": for each property φ, either φ or its negation ¬φ must be positive, but not both (axiom 2). If a positive property φ implies a property ψ in each possible world, then ψ is positive, too (axiom 1). Gödel then argues that each positive property is "possibly exemplified", i.e. applies at least to some object in some world (theorem 1). Defining an object to be Godlike if it has all positive properties (definition 1), and requiring that property to be positive itself (axiom 3), Gödel shows that in some possible world a Godlike object exists (theorem 2), called "God" in the following. Gödel proceeds to prove that a Godlike object exists in every possible world.

To this end, he defines essences: if x is an object in some world, then a property φ is said to be an essence of x if φ(x) is true in that world and if φ necessarily entails all other properties that x has in that world (definition 2). Requiring positive properties being positive in every possible world (axiom 4), Gödel can show that Godlikeness is an essence of a Godlike object (theorem 3). Now, x is said to exist necessarily if, for every essence φ of x, there is an element y with property φ in every possible world (definition 3). Axiom 5 requires necessary existence to be a positive property.

Hence, it must follow from Godlikeness. Moreover, Godlikeness is an essence of God, since it entails all positive properties, and any non-positive property is the negation of some positive property, so God cannot have any non-positive properties. Since necessary existence is also a positive property (axiom 5), it must be a property of every Godlike object, as every Godlike object has all the positive properties (definition 1). Since any Godlike object is necessarily existent, it follows that any Godlike object in one world is a Godlike object in all worlds, by the definition of necessary existence. Given the existence of a Godlike object in one world, proven above, we may conclude that there is a Godlike object in every possible world, as required (theorem 4). Besides axiom 1-5 and definition 1-3, a few other axioms from modal logic were tacitly used in the proof.

From these hypotheses, it is also possible to prove that there is only one God in each world by Leibniz's law, the identity of indiscernibles: two or more objects are identical (the same) if they have all their properties in common, and so, there would only be one object in each world that possesses property G. Gödel did not attempt to do so however, as he purposely limited his proof to the issue of existence, rather than uniqueness.

Symbolic notation

Criticism

Most criticism of Gödel's proof is aimed at its axioms: as with any proof in any logical system, if the axioms the proof depends on are doubted, then the conclusions can be doubted. It is particularly applicable to Gödel's proof – because it rests on five axioms, some of which are considered questionable. A proof does not necessitate that the conclusion be correct, but rather that by accepting the axioms, the conclusion follows logically.

Many philosophers have called the axioms into question. The first layer of criticism is simply that there are no arguments presented that give reasons why the axioms are true. A second layer is that these particular axioms lead to unwelcome conclusions. This line of thought was argued by Jordan Howard Sobel, showing that if the axioms are accepted, they lead to a "modal collapse" where every statement that is true is necessarily true, i.e. the sets of necessary, of contingent, and of possible truths all coincide (provided there are accessible worlds at all). According to Robert Koons, Sobel suggested in a 2005 conference paper that Gödel might have welcomed modal collapse.

There are suggested amendments to the proof, presented by C. Anthony Anderson, but argued to be refutable by Anderson and Michael Gettings. Sobel's proof of modal collapse has been questioned by Koons, but a counter-defence by Sobel has been given.

Gödel's proof has also been questioned by Graham Oppy, asking whether many other almost-gods would also be "proven" through Gödel's axioms. This counter-argument has been questioned by Gettings, who agrees that the axioms might be questioned, but disagrees that Oppy's particular counter-example can be shown from Gödel's axioms.

Religious scholar Fr. Robert J. Spitzer accepted Gödel's proof, calling it "an improvement over the Anselmian Ontological Argument (which does not work)."

There are, however, many more criticisms, most focusing on the question of whether these axioms must be rejected to avoid odd conclusions. The broader criticism is that even if the axioms cannot be shown to be false, that does not mean that they are true. Hilbert's famous remark about interchangeability of the primitives' names applies to those in Gödel's ontological axioms ("positive", "god-like", "essence") as well as to those in Hilbert's geometry axioms ("point", "line", "plane"). According to André Fuhrmann (2005) it remains to show that the dazzling notion prescribed by traditions and often believed to be essentially mysterious satisfies Gödel's axioms. This is not a mathematical, but a theological task. It is this task which decides which religion's god has been proven to exist.

Computer-verified versions

Christoph Benzmüller and Bruno Woltzenlogel-Paleo formalized Gödel's proof to a level that is suitable for automated theorem proving or at least computer verification via proof assistants. The effort made headlines in German newspapers. According to the authors of this effort, they were inspired by Melvin Fitting's book.

In 2014, they computer-verified Gödel's proof (in the above version).
They also proved that this version's axioms are consistent,
but imply modal collapse, thus confirming Sobel's 1987 argument.

In the same paper, they suspected Gödel's original version of the axioms to be inconsistent, as they failed to prove their consistency.
In 2016, they gave a computer proof that this version implies , i.e. is inconsistent in every modal logic with a reflexive or symmetric accessibility relation.
Moreover, they gave an argument that this version is inconsistent in every logic at all, but failed to duplicate it by automated provers. However, they were able to verify Melvin Fitting's reformulation of the argument and guarantee its consistency.

In literature 
A humorous variant of Gödel's ontological proof is mentioned in Quentin Canterel's novel The Jolly Coroner.
The proof is also mentioned in the TV series Hand of God.

Jeffrey Kegler's 2007 novel The God Proof depicts the (fictional) rediscovery of Gödel's lost notebook about the ontological proof.

See also
 Existence of God
 Philosophy of religion
 Theism
 Ontological argument

Notes

References

Further reading
 Frode Alfson Bjørdal, "Understanding Gödel's Ontological Argument", in T. Childers (ed.), The Logica Yearbook 1998, Prague 1999, 214-217.
 Frode Alfson Bjørdal, "All Properties are Divine, or God Exists", in Logic and Logical Philosophy, Vol. 27 No. 3, 2018, pp. 329–350.
 Bromand, Joachim. "Gödels ontologischer Beweis und andere modallogische Gottesbeweise", in J. Bromand und G. Kreis (Hg.), Gottesbeweise von Anselm bis Gödel, Berlin 2011, 381-491.
 
 Melvin Fitting, "Types, Tableaus, and Godel's God" Publisher: Dordrecht Kluwer Academic, 2002, 
  — See Chapter "Ontological Proof", pp. 403–404, and Appendix B "Texts Relating to the Ontological Proof", pp. 429–437.
 Goldman, Randolph R. "Gödel's Ontological Argument", PhD Diss., University of California, Berkeley 2000.
 Hazen, A. P. "On Gödel's Ontological Proof", Australasian Journal of Philosophy, Vol. 76, No 3, pp. 361–377, September 1998

External links

 Annotated bibliography of studies on Gödel's Ontological Argument
 Thomas Gawlick, Was sind und was sollen mathematische Gottesbeweise?, Jan. 2012 — shows Gödel's original proof manuscript on p. 2-3
A Divine Consistency Proof for Mathematics  — A submitted work by Harvey Friedman showing that if God exists (in the sense of Gödel), then Mathematics, as formalized by the usual ZFC axioms, is consistent.

Arguments for the existence of God
Modal logic
Ontological proof